The GWR 4900 Class locomotive No. 5967 Bickmarsh Hall was built at Swindon railway works, and was completed in March 1937. First allocated to Chester, in August 1950 it was allocated to Banbury, and then in March 1959 to Newton Abbot. Fitted with a boiler from a Modified Hall with 3 row superheater during its last overhaul at Swindon in 1961, it was then given its last allocation to Westbury.

Withdrawn in June 1964 it was sold to Woodham Brothers scrapyard in Barry, South Wales, where Bickmarsh Hall stayed until it was bought by the Pontypool and Blaenavon Railway. The locomotive left as the 187th departure from the scrapyard, in August 1987. Currently paired with  Collett tender number 2910, it is preserved at the Northampton & Lamport Railway where it is undergoing a slow restoration.

External links 
  maintained by the locomotive owners
Bickmarsh Hall page at Northampton & Lamport Railway web site

5967
Railway locomotives introduced in 1937
5967
Locomotives saved from Woodham Brothers scrapyard
Standard gauge steam locomotives of Great Britain
4-6-0 locomotives